The Democratic Conviction (BD) is a political party in Albania that was registered on April 23, 2019, belongs to the center-right political spectrum. Its coordinator is Astrit Patozi.

History 
Democratic Conviction was created during the 2019 Albanian protests. It participated in the 2021 Albanian parliamentary election, winning 0.5% of the vote and no seats.

Notes

References

See also
 List of political parties in Albania

Political parties in Albania